Annelise Koster (born ) is a Namibian artistic gymnast, representing her nation at international competitions. 

In September 2015 Koster competed in the All Africa Games held in Brazzaville. She finished sixth in the uneven bars and seventh in the balance beam, having failed to make the final of the vault. (The floor exercise was cancelled after event organisers ordered the wrong gymnastics floor.)

Koster competed at the 2015 World Artistic Gymnastics Championships in Glasgow in October 2015. She took part in the uneven bars event, but did not progress through to the final.

References

1999 births
Living people
Namibian female artistic gymnasts
Place of birth missing (living people)
Competitors at the 2015 African Games
African Games competitors for Namibia